Azizia Masjid or Majid-e-Azizia (Urdu: مسجد عزیزیہ; Hindi: मस्जिद अजीजिया) is a congregational mosque in Mehdipatnam, Hyderabad, India. It is the largest mosque in Mehdipatnam with a capacity of over 10,000 people. The mosque was built in 1966 and now has building of 4 floors. It is headquarter of Students Islamic Organization of India and Islamic Center of Jamaat-e-Islami Hind.

History 
The foundation stone was laid in 1966 by Abdul Hafeez Khan, he named the mosque Azizia after his father’s name, Abdul Azeez.

Facilities

Religious 
Tis mosque is the largest mosque in Mehdipatnam with 4 floors that can accommodate over 10,000 people. It has a Wudu Khana (Ablution Center) on every floor. It holds the Friday Jumma prayers every week and the sermons (bayan) is delivered by Aijaz Mohiuddin Waseem which focuses on current and contemporary socio-economic issues based on the Quran & Sunnah.

Non-Religious 
Besides being a mosque; it also serves as a "community center." The mosque helps address the issues of health, education, jobs, etc.

It provides medical aid to the poor irrespective of religion, you can test your BP and Sugar levels after the Fajr prayer free of cost.

It offers gold loans without any interest to the poor and pensions to widows and the elderly. The mosque also displays announcement of job vacancies in various government departments on its notice board.

The mosque runs a school of ‘Hifz’ where the Imam trains students in memorizing the  Quran. It also conducts summer workshops for both boys and girls. According to Sheikh Imaduddin Madani, the imam of the mosque: Masjid-e-Nabawi (Prophet’s mosque in Medina) had a medical facility, The mosque should not merely be a place of worship. It should serve as a platform to solve the problems of the milli (community), train the people in developing their character and personality for the success in this world and the hereafter.The masjid also has plans to expand these community services by setting up an Islamic center for inter-faith dialogues.

Online presence 
This mosque is one of the few in the area to have an online presence. After implementing the Web 3.0 technology, the sermons given on Friday and in Ramadan are broadcast on YouTube. Many of the young people have also opened a Facebook account in its name to propagate its activities

Further reading 

 Protest Against CAA and NRC at Masjid-E-Azizia ~ siasat.com
 Signature campaign against CAA, NRC, NPR in Hyderabad ~ telanganatoday
 Hyderabad: Masjids as community centres a healthy trend ~ decccanchronicle
 مصلیان عزیزیہ مسجد کا دھرنا ~ munsifdaily

References 

Hyderabad, India